Tropothrips is a genus of thrips in the family Phlaeothripidae.

Species
 Tropothrips borgmeieri
 Tropothrips dampfi
 Tropothrips nigripes
 Tropothrips richardsi
 Tropothrips tuxtlae

References

Phlaeothripidae
Thrips
Thrips genera